Liz McDaid is a South African activist who is the "Eco-Justice Lead" for the Southern African Faith Communities' Environment Institute (SAFCEI). Along with Makoma Lekalakala, she was awarded the 2018 Goldman Environmental Prize for the African region for their work on using the courts to stop a Russian-South African nuclear deal in 2017. In 2018 McDaid and Lekalakala received the Nick Steele Memorial Award for their work in winning a crucial court case to halt plans by the South African government to proceed with a national nuclear build programme.
McDaid is currently Head of Energy at Organisation Undoing Tax Abuse.

References

South African environmentalists
South African women environmentalists
Living people
Year of birth missing (living people)
Goldman Environmental Prize awardees